The 2005 Tippmix Budapest Grand Prix was a women's tennis tournament played on outdoor clay courts in Budapest, Hungary that was part of the Tier IV category of the 2005 WTA Tour. It was the 11th edition of the tournament and was held from 25 July until 31 July 2005. First-seeded Anna Smashnova won the singles title and earned $22,000 first-prize money.

Finals

Singles

 Anna Smashnova defeated  Catalina Castaño 6–2, 6–2
 It was Smashnova's 2nd singles title of the year and the 11th of her career.

Doubles

 Émilie Loit /  Katarina Srebotnik defeated  Lourdes Domínguez Lino /  Marta Marrero 6–1, 3–6, 6–2

External links
 ITF tournament edition details
 Tournament draws

Colortex Budapest Grand Prix
Budapest Grand Prix
Buda
Buda